İkinci Mahmudlu (also, Makhmudly Vtoroy and Makhmudlu Vtoroye) is a village in the Fuzuli District of Azerbaijan.  The village forms part of the municipality of Əhmədbəyli.

References 

Populated places in Fuzuli District